The European qualification for the 2021 World Women's Handball Championship, in Spain, was played over two rounds.

In the first round of qualification, 17 teams who were not participating at the 2020 European Championship were split into two groups of four and three groups of three teams. The top two teams of each group advanced to the second phase, where the teams joined the remaining 10 teams from the European Championship and played play-off games to determine the qualified teams.

Qualification phase 1

Seeding
The draw was held on 8 July 2020 in Vienna, Austria. The top two teams of each group advance to the play-off round. Each group will play their matches in a mini-tournament at a pre-selected location.

On 13 November 2020, the EHF decided to postpone the matches, scheduled for December 2020, to March 2021 due to the COVID-19 pandemic.

All times are UTC+1.

Group 1

Group 2

Group 3

Group 4

Group 5

Qualification phase 2
The teams played a home-and away series to determine the participants for the final tournament. The draw took place on 22 March 2021.

Seedings

All times are UTC+2.

Overview

|}

Matches

Russia won 80–47 on aggregate.

Czech Republic won 55–49 on aggregate.

Slovenia won 45–35 on aggregate.

Serbia won 58–44 on aggregate.

Sweden won 50–40 on aggregate.

Austria won 58–55 on aggregate.

Hungary won 87–31 on aggregate.

Romania won 68–42 on aggregate.

Germany won 66–50 on aggregate.

Montenegro won 55–47 on aggregate.

Notes

References

2021 in women's handball
World Handball Championship tournaments
Qualification for handball competitions
Women's Handball Championship, European Qualification 2021